Cow's Skull: Red, White, and Blue is a painting by American artist Georgia O'Keeffe.  The painting depicts a cow skull centered in front of what appears to be a cloth background.  In the center of the background is a vertical black stripe.  On either side of that are two vertical stripes of white laced with blue.  At the outside of the painting are two vertical red stripes.

History
O'Keeffe created the painting in 1931.  It is done in oil on canvas and measures 39 7/8 x 35 7/8 inches. (101.3 x 91.1 cm).  It is part of the Alfred Stieglitz Collection (1952) of the Metropolitan Museum of Art.

Around the time of the painting's creation, American artists sought out themes for the "Great American Novel" or "Great American Story".

References

1931 paintings
Works about the United States
Paintings by Georgia O'Keeffe
Paintings in the collection of the Metropolitan Museum of Art
Cattle in art
Skulls in art